Michael "Spider" Maxwell is an American retired gymnast. He competed for Penn State University and won the 1987 Nissen Award (the "Heisman" of men's gymnastics).

Maxwell graduated from Woodward Academy in 1983 and earned a full gymnastics scholarship to Pennsylvania State University. In 1987, Maxwell won the bronze medal at the USA Gymnastics National Championships.

References

Year of birth missing (living people)
Living people
Penn State Nittany Lions men's gymnasts
American gymnasts
Place of birth missing (living people)
Pennsylvania State University alumni
Woodward Academy alumni